The 1931 West Virginia Mountaineers football team was an American football team that represented West Virginia University as an independent during the 1931 college football season. In its first season under head coach Greasy Neale, the team compiled a 4–6 record and was outscored by a total of 122 to 91. The team played its home games at Mountaineer Field in Morgantown, West Virginia. John Doyle was the team captain.

Schedule

References

West Virginia
West Virginia Mountaineers football seasons
West Virginia Mountaineers football